Sphegina setosa is a species of hoverfly in the family Syrphidae.

Distribution
Nepal.

References

Eristalinae
Insects described in 2018
Diptera of Asia